Louis J. Marinelli (born 1986 or 1987) is a political activist known for having launched a campaign for California independence in 2014, re-branded as Yes California in 2015. Marinelli is the president of Yes California and the former interim chairman of the California National Party, under which he also ran for California State Assembly in California's 80th State Assembly district representing south San Diego, National City, Chula Vista, San Ysidro, and the surrounding communities, where he had been teaching English for EF Education First. In 2016, he moved to Yekaterinburg, Russia to teach English abroad and later relocated to Moscow in 2018 to become a kindergarten English teacher there. Marinelli left Russia with his family in December, 2021, to return to the United States.

Prior to his California secession and independence activism, Marinelli was a controversial figure in the debate over same-sex marriage in the United States, until his public resignation from the National Organization for Marriage in April 2011, out of his new-found support for same-sex marriage.

Early life

Life in Russia
Marinelli first visited Russia in 2006 on a student exchange program with Saint Petersburg State University. Over the next five years he spent time between California and Russia, teaching English in Samara and Kazan before settling in San Diego in 2011.

In 2016, Marinelli moved to Yekaterinburg, Russia with his wife, partially for visa reasons. In 2017, announcing withdrawal of the California Independence Referendum ballot measure from the 2018 election, Marinelli confirmed his intention to live in Russia, stating "I have found in Russia a new happiness, a life without the albatross of frustration and resentment towards ones' homeland, and a future detached from the partisan divisions and animosity that has thus far engulfed my entire adult life."

Marinelli moved to Moscow in the fall of 2018. In the summer of 2019, Marinelli was briefly detained by Moscow police while attending an unsanctioned political march in support of investigative journalist Ivan Golunov.

In August 2020, Marinelli authored a Russian-language essay professing his love of reading to young children, and asserting that he was confident that the collapse of the United States was imminent.

Marinelli returned to the United States and as of August 2022, lives in Arkansas.

Political activism

Protect Marriage and the National Organization for Marriage
In the Summer of 2010, Marinelli was paid by the National Organization for Marriage (NOM) to tour the United States on a bus to rally against same-sex marriage.

In December 2010, Marinelli broke ranks with the NOM and announced support for the repeal of "Don't ask, don't tell". On April 11, 2011, Marinelli announced his support for marriage equality. NOM threatened Marinelli with legal action for violating a confidentiality agreement. NOM told Marinelli to remove copies of NOM's internal materials from his website.

California independence campaign

Again claiming disillusionment with the United States government and political system, in 2014 Marinelli launched a campaign for California to secede from the United States to become an independent country. Under the name "Sovereign California", Marinelli grew another social media platform on Facebook and Twitter to champion this cause. Shortly thereafter, Marinelli became acquainted with an author and researcher by the name of Marcus Ruiz Evans, who wrote a book called California's Next Century, which argued for California to obtain sub-national sovereignty within the United States through a process called devolution. Marinelli and Marcus Ruiz Evans adopted this idea as the goal of Sovereign California.

In 2015, with the release of a 165-page report on California's future (of the same title), Marinelli and Ruiz Evans re-branded Sovereign California's name and mission to that of Yes California, inspired by the 2014 Yes Scotland campaign for the 2014 Scottish independence referendum, and announced their plan to achieve full independence from the United States, or secession, via an independence referendum for California in 2020. This re-branding came as a result of research conducted and assembled into their 165-page report, as well as from feedback from the public while touring the state with their message of devolution.

On January 6, 2016, the California Secretary of State's office sent a memorandum to all 58 county Registrar of Voters acknowledging the establishment of the California National Party and asked that each county "track all registrations and inform this office of the number of voters registered with the California National Party for all future reports of registration." Marinelli was subsequently listed on the California Secretary of State's website as the interim chairman of this party.  He was voted out at their first party conference in 2016 and officially disavowed by the party when he announced his intention to relocate to Russia a few months later.

2016 campaign for California State Assembly
Marinelli ran for the California State Assembly in California's 80th State Assembly district against Lorena Gonzalez. Marinelli's platform was to push for California's secession from the United States.

Marinelli's ballot designation was "California Independence Leader". Marinelli did not list a party preference. In the primary, Marinelli received 6.4 percent of the vote and did not continue to the general election.

2016 California State Assembly

California ballot initiative proposals
In 2015, Marinelli was the primary proponent of several citizen's ballot initiatives most of which were related to California's secession from the United States. Columnist Patt Morrison wrote that Marinelli " has paid $200 a pop to try to get nine initiatives on a statewide ballot, all of them about making California not an entirely separate country but a “first among equals” sovereign entity distinct from those 49 also-rans."

One initiative would create a panel to explore more state autonomy. Another would change the title of the chief executive of the state of California from Governor to President. None of the initiatives qualified.

2018 ballot measure attempt 
In late 2016 Marinelli and Yes California began to gather signatures to qualify a ballot measure on California secession at the November 2018 election. Yes California abandoned the attempt in April 2017 after months of negative publicity because Marinelli lived in Russia. Organizers said they wanted to avoid links to Russian leader Vladimir Putin.

Ties to Russian government influence operations 
In August 2022, the US Department of Justice indicted Russian national Aleksandr Ionov for collaborating with the Russian government in attempting to influence in U.S. elections. The Sacramento Bee identified Marinelli and Yes California as beneficiaries of Ionov's support. Marinelli acknowledged that he knew Ionov, but denied that he knowingly aided the Russian government.

References

External links 
 Yes California website
 Assembly campaign website

Living people
California politicians
Activists from California
Year of birth missing (living people)